Claudio Ariel Yacob (born 18 July 1987) is an Argentine professional footballer who plays as a defensive midfielder.

He began his career at Racing Club, and played two international games for Argentina in 2011. He moved to England's West Bromwich Albion in 2012 where he made 171 total appearances over six Premier League seasons. After a brief spell with Nottingham Forest in the Championship, he signed for Nacional in January 2020.

Club career

West Bromwich Albion
On 24 July 2012, Yacob was loaned to Premier League club West Bromwich Albion on a three-year deal. He had been a free agent following the end of his five-year association with Racing Club de Avellaneda. He made his debut against Liverpool on 18 August, in a 3–0 home win, and was described as "outstanding" by Stuart James of The Guardian. In his debut season, he developed a strong midfield partnership with Youssouf Mulumbu, and won the club's player of the month award for March 2013.

Yacob scored his first West Brom goal on 6 October 2013, heading Morgan Amalfitano's cross to open a 1–1 draw with Arsenal at The Hawthorns. He was sent off twice in 2014–15: a straight red for a 29th-minute foul on Diego Costa in a 2–0 loss at Chelsea on 22 November, and a double booking on 7 March in a 2–0 loss to rivals Aston Villa in the sixth round of the FA Cup.

Yacob signed a new two-year contract with the Baggies on 10 July 2015. He signed a further deal on 29 September 2016, in the shape of a two-year contract with an option of a further one.

On 20 June 2018, it was announced that Yacob would leave West Brom upon the expiration of his contract.

Nottingham Forest
On 6 September 2018, Yacob signed with EFL Championship club Nottingham Forest on a two-year deal. He made his debut on 3 November, playing the full 90 minutes of a 1–0 home win over leaders Sheffield United.

Having not featured at all in the season, Yacob and Forest agreed to mutually terminate his contract on 27 January 2020.

Nacional
On the same day as leaving Forest, Yacob joined Uruguayan Primera División side Nacional. He made his debut on 1 February in the 2020 Supercopa Uruguaya, as a half-time substitute for Joaquín Trasante in a 4–2 extra-time loss to Liverpool F.C. (Montevideo). Three weeks later in his second league game, he scored in the seventh minute of added time to grasp a 2–2 home draw against Cerro Largo FC.

International career
Yacob earned two senior caps for Argentina, both in friendlies in the first half of 2011. On 16 March, he debuted in a 4–1 win over Venezuela, being replaced after an hour by Fabián Rinaudo. On 20 April, he scored in a 2–2 draw with Ecuador at the Estadio José María Minella in Mar del Plata, as did his Racing Club teammate Gabriel Hauche in an experimental team made up of domestic-based players.

Personal life
When not playing football, Yacob enjoys playing the guitar and painting. He also describes himself as a big fan of the Beatles and Adele.

Career statistics

References

External links
Claudio Yacob – Argentine Primera statistics at Fútbol XXI  
Claudio Yacob at Football Lineups

Claudio Yavob at National Football Teams

1987 births
Living people
People from San Lorenzo Department
Argentine footballers
Argentina international footballers
Argentina under-20 international footballers
Association football midfielders
Argentine expatriate footballers
Racing Club de Avellaneda footballers
West Bromwich Albion F.C. players
Nottingham Forest F.C. players
Club Nacional de Football players
Club Atlético Huracán footballers
Rosario Central footballers
Club Universitario de Deportes footballers
Uruguayan Primera División players
Argentine Primera División players
Premier League players
English Football League players
Expatriate footballers in England
Expatriate footballers in Uruguay
Argentine expatriate sportspeople in England
Argentine expatriate sportspeople in Uruguay
Sportspeople from Santa Fe Province